

Presidency

Timeline of the presidency of Barack Obama (2009)
Timeline of the presidency of Barack Obama (2010)
Timeline of the presidency of Barack Obama (2011)
Timeline of the presidency of Barack Obama (2012)
Timeline of the presidency of Barack Obama (2013)
Timeline of the presidency of Barack Obama (2014)
Timeline of the presidency of Barack Obama (2015)
Timeline of the presidency of Barack Obama (2016)
Timeline of the presidency of Barack Obama (2017)
First 100 days of Barack Obama's presidency
Foreign policy of the Barack Obama administration
Political positions of Barack Obama
Public image of Barack Obama
List of federal judges appointed by Barack Obama
Presidential transition of Barack Obama
Confirmations of Barack Obama's Cabinet
Barack Obama Supreme Court candidates
Barack Obama speech to joint session of Congress, 2009
First inauguration of Barack Obama
Second inauguration of Barack Obama
List of unofficial events for the inauguration of Barack Obama
We Are One: The Obama Inaugural Celebration at the Lincoln Memorial

2008 campaign

2008 United States presidential election
2008 United States presidential election timeline
List of Barack Obama presidential campaign endorsements, 2008
Barack Obama presidential primary campaign, 2008
Barack Obama election victory speech 2008
Jeremiah Wright controversy
Bill Ayers presidential election controversy
Oprah Winfrey's endorsement of Barack Obama
Republican and conservative support for Barack Obama in 2008
Newspaper endorsements in the United States presidential election, 2008, for Barack Obama
Invitations to the inauguration of Barack Obama
2008 Democratic National Convention
A More Perfect Union (speech)  Obama's campaign speech on race
List of Barack Obama presidential campaign staff members, 2008
List of Barack Obama presidential campaign endorsements from state, local and territory officials
Results of the 2008 Democratic Party presidential primaries
Nationwide opinion polling for the United States presidential election, 2008
Comparison of United States presidential candidates, 2008
Congressional endorsements for the 2008 United States presidential election
Nationwide opinion polling for the Democratic Party 2008 presidential candidates
South Carolina Democratic primary, 2008
United States presidential election in Iowa, 2008

Career
Electoral history of Barack Obama
Early life and career of Barack Obama
United States Senate career of Barack Obama
Illinois Senate career of Barack Obama
Illinois Senate elections of Barack Obama
List of bills sponsored by Barack Obama in the United States Senate
2004 Democratic National Convention keynote address
United States Senate election in Illinois, 2004
Illinois's 1st congressional district election, 2000

Family members

Immediate family
Michelle Obama Obama's wife
Marian Shields Robinson Michelle Obama's mother
Bo (dog) First Family's pet

Extended family
Ann Dunham Obama's mother
Barack Obama, Sr. Obama's father
Lolo Soetoro Indonesian stepfather
Madelyn Dunham Maternal grandmother
Maya Soetoro-Ng Obama's half-sister
Stanley Armour Dunham Obama's maternal grandfather
Zeituni Onyango Obama's half aunt
Charles T. Payne Obama's great uncle who served in World War II

Michelle Obama's extended family
Craig Robinson Michelle Obama's older brother
Capers C. Funnye Jr. Michelle Obama's first cousin once removed

Books

By Barack Obama
The Audacity of Hope
Dreams from My Father

About Barack Obama
The Speech: Race and Barack Obama's "A More Perfect Union" - collection of writings regarding Obama's speech "A More Perfect Union"
Barack Obama - Der schwarze Kennedy ("Barack Obama - The Black Kennedy") - German biography in support of Obama's presidential run
The Obama Nation - controversial book arguing against Obama's presidential run
The Case Against Barack Obama - book arguing against Obama's presidential run, focusing on his policies
A Bound Man: Why We Are Excited About Obama and Why He Can't Win - a 2007 book by Shelby Steele which focuses on Obama's ethnic identity

Named after Barack Obama
List of things named after Barack Obama

Miscellaneous

Barack Obama citizenship conspiracy theories
Barack Obama religion conspiracy theories
Barack Obama "Hope" poster
Barack Obama "Joker" poster
Obama logo
Barack Obama (comic character)
"Spidey Meets the President!"
Barack the Barbarian
2008 Barack Obama assassination scare
"There's No One as Irish as Barack O'Bama" - folk song
Yes We Can Video supporting Obama
Nyang’oma Kogelo
Barack's Dubs
Nanobama (artwork)

Topics
2000s politics-related lists
2010s politics-related lists
African American-related lists
Topics in culture
United States politics-related lists
Barack Obama